John Angel or John Angell may refer to:

John Angel (sculptor) (1881–1960), British-born sculptor, medallist and lecturer
John Lawrence Angel (1915–1986), British-American biological anthropologist
John Angel (chaplain) (fl. 1555), chaplain to Mary I of England and Philip II of Spain
John Bartlett Angel (1913–1993), activist for the improvement of education and welfare in Newfoundland
John Angell (1592–1670), MP for Rye (UK Parliament constituency)
John Angel (preacher) (died 1655), or John Angell, English preacher
John Angell (shorthand writer) (fl. 1758), Irish shorthand writer

See also
John Angell James (1785–1859), English Nonconformist clergyman and writer
Johnny Angel (disambiguation)